Mebhydrolin (INN) or mebhydroline is an antihistamine. It is not available in the United States, but it is in various other countries under the brand names Bexidal (BD) and Diazolin (RU). It is used for symptomatic relief of allergic symptoms caused by histamine release, including nasal allergies and allergic dermatosis.

Mebhydrolin has been shown to magnify the performance-deficit effects of alcohol.

References

H1 receptor antagonists
Gamma-Carbolines